You may also be looking for Kholm Governorate of the Russian Empire from 1914-1915.

Kholm Governorate was a territorial division of Ukraine that was recreated under the Skoropadsky administration in the western parts of Volyn Governorate. The governorate was created after the resignation of the Hetman of Ukraine, while the armed forces of Central Powers started a mass withdrawal from occupied territories.

Unlike the original Kholm Governorate that was created before World War I, the new territory was mostly created out of the southern parts of Grodno Governorate and eastern parts of former Sedlets Governorate.

Ukrainian authorities were not able to establish its presence in the southern parts of governorate and since early December 1918 the whole governorate was occupied by the Polish Army.

External links
 Sklyarov, S. Polish-Ukrainian territorial arguments and big powers in 1918-1919. MGU of Lomonosov, College of History.

Chełm
Governorates of Ukraine